Seth Isaac Johnson (born July 10, 2000) is a Canadian actor who also has a Behavioral NeuroScience Degree with distinction from UBC. He is most recently known in the recurring role of Eugene in Season 2 of the hit series Firefly Lane. Early in his career, Seth was notable for his recurring dramatic role as Denny Larsen in AMC's The Killing and also for a guest star comedic role as Langley in Disney XD's Mech-X4. In film Johnson was cast in heavily contrasting dramatic and comedic leads including Danny in Nickelodeon's Splitting Adam, and Arden Lowe in V.C Andrew's My Sweet Audrina. In his later teens he began appearing in lead roles in coming of age teen "dramedy"s such as Bryce in Young and Reckless, Shawn Raider in CW's Supernatural and as Hansel in ABC's Once Upon a Time.

Life and career
Johnson has Degree in Behavioral NeuroScience from UBC (with Distinction). He started acting when he followed the footsteps of his older sibling in playing Tiny Tim in an adaptation of A Christmas Carol at the Citadel Theatre. He was the youngest child actor ever cast in the part at the Citadel.

Johnson's big break came with his first major role in AMC's award-winning The Killing, where he played Denny Larsen, a role for which he received a Young Artist Award nomination and praise from director Patty Jenkins, who directed both The Killing'''s pilot and season finale episodes. Johnson appeared in 26 episodes in season 1 and 2.

Johnson also played other roles, such as a transgender teen in Dangers of Online Dating, and the traumatized bloodied teen Shawn Raider in the thirteenth season of Supernatural''.

Seth is the son of actor Tanis Dolman and musician Jason O. Johnson.

Filmography

Film and television

Awards and nominations 
Johnson was nominated for "Best Performance in a TV Series (Comedy or Drama) - Supporting Young Actor
The Killing (2011)  category at the 34th Young Artist Awards.

Johnson was 2015 Joey Award Winner Best Actor in a Feature for his portrayal of Beckett in Into the Grizzly Maze.

Johnson was nominated for “Best Guest Performance” for his portrayal of Shawn Raider in the Supernatural episode “Advanced Thanatology” in the 2018 Leo Awards.

References

External links
http://www.tvguide.com/celebrities/seth-isaac-johnson/credits/374697/
AMC Q&A with Seth Isaac Johnson
Supernatural interview with Seth Isaac Johnson 

Living people
2000 births
Canadian male television actors
Canadian male film actors
21st-century Canadian male actors